György Ipacs (30 January 1933 – 26 May 2006) was a Hungarian swimmer. He competed in the men's 100 metre freestyle at the 1952 Summer Olympics.

References

1933 births
2006 deaths
Hungarian male swimmers
Olympic swimmers of Hungary
Swimmers at the 1952 Summer Olympics
Swimmers from Budapest
Hungarian male freestyle swimmers
20th-century Hungarian people
21st-century Hungarian people